The Union of Social Democrats of Bosnia and Herzegovina (UBSD) was a political party in Bosnia and Herzegovina.

History
The UBSD was formed by the Bosnian section of the Union of Reform Forces after the breakup of Yugoslavia. It contested the 1996 general election as part of the Joint List alliance alongside the Social Democratic Party, the Muslim Bosniak Organisation, the Croatian Peasant Party and the Republican Party. The Joint List put forward Sead Avdić as its candidate for Bosniak member of the Presidency, but he finished fourth with just 0.9% of the vote. Its candidate for the Croat member, Ivo Komšić, finished second, but far behind winning candidate Krešimir Zubak. In the election for the House of Representatives, the Joint List received 4.4% of the vote and won two seats in the Federation of Bosnia and Herzegovina and 1.3% of the vote and no seats in Republika Srpska.

In the 1998 general election the party did not put forward a presidential candidate, but won two seats in the national House of Representatives. It merged with into Social Democratic Party in February 1999.

References

1999 disestablishments in Bosnia and Herzegovina
Defunct political parties in Bosnia and Herzegovina
Political parties disestablished in 1999
Political parties with year of establishment missing
Social democratic parties in Bosnia and Herzegovina